Fabiana Luperini (born 14 January 1974) is an Italian professional cyclist. Luperini has won the  a record five times, with four consecutive victories in 1995–1998 and a fifth ten years later, in 2008. She has won the  three times consecutively, from 1995 to 1997.

Major results

1993
1st Vertemate con Minoprio 
1st Tour de Okinawa

1994 
1st 
1st Stages 3 & 4 
3rd Overall 

1995
1st  Overall 
1st  Overall 
1st  Overall 
2nd Overall 

1996 
1st  National Road Race Championships
1st  Overall 
1st  Overall 
1st  Overall 

1997 
1st  Overall 
1st  Overall 

1998 
1st  Overall 
1st  Overall 
1st 
2nd Overall 
2nd Overall 

1999 
1st  Overall 
2nd Overall 

2000 
1st 
2nd Overall 
2nd 
2nd Embrach
3rd Overall 

2001 
1st 
2nd Overall 
2nd GP Suisse Féminin

2002 
1st  Overall 
1st 
2nd National Road Race Championships
3rd Brest - Pont-de-Buis

2003 
1st Stage 6 

2004 
1st  National Road Race Championships
1st Tour de Berne 
2nd Overall 
1st Stage 5 
3rd Overall Emakumeen Bira

2005 
1st Stage 2 
1st Stage 3a Emakumeen Bira
1st Stage 1 Giro di San Marino

2006 
1st  National Road Race Championships
1st  Overall Emakumeen Bira 
1st Stage 3a
1st Giro del Lago Maggiore 
1st 
1st Giro del Friuli Donne

2007 
1st 
1st Stage 5 
2nd Overall 
1st Stage 1 
2nd Overall 
1st Stage 4 & 5

2008 
1st  National Road Race Championships
1st  Overall 
1st Stages 4 & 7
1st  Overall 
1st Stage 2
1st GP Varazze Citta Delle Donne
1st GP Ouest France

2009 
1st Stage 6 
2nd Overall  
1st Stage 2

2012
1st Stage 2a

References

External links

1974 births
Living people
People from Pontedera
Italian female cyclists
Sportspeople from the Province of Pisa
Cyclists from Tuscany